Tervakosken Pato (abbreviated Pato) is a football club from Tervakoski, Janakkala, Finland. The club was formed in 1902 and their home ground is at the Tervakosken urheilukenttä. The men's first team currently plays in the Kolmonen (Third Division).

Background

In the 1970s the club played in the lower levels of Finnish football (in Divisions 4 and 5) but over the last thirty years Pato has competed mainly in the Kolmonen (Division 3).

Season to season

Club structure

Tervakosken Pato run a number of teams including 2 men's teams, 2 men's veterans team, 5 boys teams and 2 girls teams.

2010 season

Pato Men's Team are competing in the Kolmonen section administered by the Tampere SPL.  This is the fourth highest tier in the Finnish football system. In 2009 Pato finished in ninth place in the Kolmonen.

Pato 2 are participating in Section 1 (Lohko 1) of the Kutonen administered by the Tampere SPL.

References and sources
Official Website
Finnish Wikipedia
Suomen Cup

Football clubs in Finland
Janakkala
1902 establishments in Finland